A Hawaiian quilt is a distinctive quilting style of the Hawaiian Islands that uses large radially symmetric applique patterns. Motifs often work stylized botanical designs in bold colors on a white background.

Hawaiian quilt applique is made from a single cut on folded fabric. Quilting stitches normally follow the contours of the applique design.

History 
Hawaiian quilting derives from the kapa moe, an indigenous bed cover textile. Kapa was constructed from the inner bark of local trees. Traditional kapa was beaten and felted, then dyed in geometric patterns.

Quilting may have begun in the Hawaiian islands with the arrival of missionaries and Western fabrics in the 1820s. The climate of Hawaii is unsuitable for cotton cultivation and kapa is unsuitable for quilting so all Hawaiian quilts are constructed from imported material. The earliest written reference comes from Isabella Bird who visited Hawaii in 1870 and wrote a travelogue Six Months in the Sandwich Islands.

Flag quilts
Another Hawaiian quilt style is the Hawaiian flag quilt, also known as Ku’u Hae Aloha ("My Beloved Flag" or "Lost Beloved Flag") quilts. The typical flag quilt includes four Hawaiian flags surrounding the coat of arms of the Hawaiian Royal Family or crown. Flag quilts combine pieced work with appliqued motifs, unlike other traditional Hawaiian quilts, which do not use pieced work.

Flag quilts may have originated as early as 1843, when Lord George Paulet claimed the Hawaiian Islands for the British and ordered all Hawaiian flags destroyed. Many of these flag quilts date back to the overthrow of the monarchy, when displaying the Hawaiian flag was considered treason. Quilts bearing symbols of the monarchy were a form of silent resistance.

Other styles

Hawaiian quilters also made other styles of quilts including embroidering quilts and crazy quilting. The most famous Hawaiian crazy quilt is the one made by Queen Liliuokalani during her internment after the overthrow of the monarchy.

Value
Antique flag quilts fetch higher prices than applique quilts: high quality flag quilts may be valued at $40,000 - $60,000 while applique quilts sell for $9000 – $15,000. Factors that affect price include the quality of the original construction, preservation of the item's color and physical integrity, and provenance.

See also 
Hawaiian art

References
 Serrao, Poakalani, The Hawaiian quilt, A spiritual experience, Reflection on its history, heritage, designing, quilting methods and patterns, Honolulu, Mutual Pub., 1997.
 Severson, Don R., Finding Paradise, Island Art in Private Collections, University of Hawaii Press, 2002, 237-254.

Footnotes

External links 

The Queen's Quilt
Quilting History of Hawaii
Bishop Museum Quilt Database
A Stitch in Time Article about Hawaiian quilters by Cheryl Tsutsumi.  Maui No Ka 'Oi Magazine Vol. 12 No.6 (November 2008).

Quilting
Quilts